Brevibora cheeya is a fish in the family Cyprinidae found in Malaysia and Indonesia.

References 

Fish described in 2011
Brevibora
Freshwater fish of Indonesia
Freshwater fish of Malaysia